The 1990 Victorian Football Association season was the 109th season of the Australian rules football competition. The premiership was won by the Williamstown Football Club, after it defeated Springvale in the grand final on 30 September by two points; it was Williamstown's twelfth top-division premiership.

Association membership

Merger between Brunswick and Broadmeadows
After enduring financial difficulties consistently since the early 1980s, the future of the Brunswick Football Club was uncertain at the end of the 1989 season. Its financial position was weak, its facilities at Gillon Oval were of increasingly poor quality, and it had only 300 members. At a special meeting on 2 October 1989, the club met to decide on its future, and by a large margin it decided to enter a merger with the Broadmeadows Football Club; rejected options were continuing in the VFA as a stand-alone club, folding, or merging with Sunshine. Under the terms of the merger, the new club was known as the Brunswick-Broadmeadows Magpies. It remained based at Gillon Oval, as Broadmeadows did not yet have its own home ground.

The Broadmeadows Football Club, known as the Falcons, was a club at an administrative level only. Its executive committee was established in 1987, and it had the support of the Broadmeadows council to develop a new Association-standard venue at the Johnstone Street Reserve, Jacana; but in the three years it had existed, it had never fielded a team in any suburban competition, and it did not have an existing home ground. The club was built entirely around its aspirations to play in the Association, and had made an unsuccessful bid to join for the 1988 season.

The Brunswick-Broadmeadows merger was not a successful venture. Its huge board, which comprised seven former Brunswick committeemen and seven former Broadmeadows committeemen, suffered throughout the year from factional fighting which limited its ability to operate effectively as a unified club. As a result, the club was unable to meaningfully address its debt problems during the year, it failed to meet its financial reporting commitments to the Association, and several committeemen and the general manager resigned from the club as a result of the board's ineffectiveness. On 1 August, the Association intervened; it sacked the club's board, and Association executive director Athol Hodgetts was appointed as the club's administrator. Hodgetts returned the club to a new board in September, but the club was still more than $250,000 in debt and at risk of Broadmeadows withdrawing from the merger. It was the beginning of the end for the club, which did not survive in the Association to the end of 1991.

Sunshine Football Club
After having withdrawn is senior and reserves teams midway through the 1989 season, Sunshine intended to regroup and return to the Association in 1990. Although the club believed it had restored a financial position stronger than at least five other struggling clubs in the competition, it appeared unlikely that the club would be permitted to continue as a stand-alone entity, so it proposed a merger with Brunswick to form a new club which would have been known as the Sunshine Magpies; but, on 2 October, Brunswick voted instead to merge with Broadmeadows. On 25 October, two days after the Fitzroy Bulldogs merger collapsed, the Association terminated Sunshine's licence. The club continued preparations for the 1990 season in the hope that it could convince the Association to change its mind, but this did not happen, bringing an end to Sunshine's 31-year stint in the competition.

Premiership season
In the home-and-away season, each team played eighteen games; the top five then contested the finals under the McIntyre final five system. The primary finals venue was North Port Oval, and the grand final was played at Princes Park.

Ladder

Finals

Grand final

Scheduling
The Grand Final was originally scheduled for Sunday, 23 September; this was intended to be a vacant day in the Australian Football League's finals fixture, meaning that the Association Grand Final was to be the premier football event in Melbourne on the day. As a result of the adjusted AFL finals fixture, the Association Grand Final was now scheduled to clash with the AFL Second Semi-Final. To overcome this, the Association pushed the date of the grand final back to Sunday, 30 September.

Springvale was unhappy with the schedule change, because it meant that it now faced a three-week break between its Second Semi-Final victory on 9 September and the grand final on 30 September, which risking upsetting its form; to try to overcome the handicap, Springvale played a practice match on 23 September against the Carlton reserves – which was also forced to endure a three-week break following adjustments made to the AFL reserves finals fixture on account of the draw in the seniors. Williamstown, which qualified through the Preliminary Final on 16 September, faced a two-week break before the grand final.

Match details
The match is famous for Williamstown's final quarter come-from-behind victory. After Williamstown led by 17 points at quarter-time, Springvale dominated the second quarter to take a 19-point lead at half-time; at three-quarter time, Springvale led by 28 points, and it kicked the first goal of the final quarter to lead by 34 points. From that point, Williamstown kicked 6.6 (42) to 1.0 (6) to recover and win the game by two points. Veteran and dual-Liston Trophy winner Bill Swan kicked the winning goal for Williamstown with fifty seconds remaining; Swan was not known for his long kicking, and most observers, including Swan, thought that the fifty metre set shot was well beyond his range. Springvale coach Phil Maylin said after the game that he thought the three-week break had contributed to his team's slow finish.

The game is considered one of the most memorable in VFA history; and in 2008, it was named as one of Australian rules football's 150 greatest moments, selected to celebrate the 150th anniversary of the sport.

Awards
The leading goalkicker for the season was Jamie Shaw (Preston), who kicked 103 goals during the season, including finals.
The J. J. Liston Trophy was won in a four-way tie by Matt Burrows (Preston), Joey Garbuio (Oakleigh), Steve Harkins (Port Melbourne) and Stuart Nicol (Springvale), who all polled 14 votes. As of 2020, it holds the record for the most players to tie for the Liston Trophy in a single year.
The Fothergill-Round Medal was won by Mathew Quirk (Oakleigh).
Coburg won the seconds premiership. Coburg 34.16 (220) defeated Prahran 19.18 (132) in the grand final, held as a curtain-raiser to the Seniors Grand Final on 30 September.

Notable events

Interleague matches
The Association played one interleague match, against the Australian Capital Territory, during the 1990 season. Phil Cleary (Coburg) was coach of the Association team, and Brett McTaggart (Williamstown) was captain.

Other notable events
Freight company Wards Express, a subsidiary of Mayne Nickless, signed on as the new major sponsor of the Association, replacing ANA Friendly Societies. The premiership trophy became known as the Mayne Nickless Premiership Cup under the arrangement.
Camberwell and Oakleigh both faced financial difficulties during the 1990 season. Oakleigh needed to raise $50,000 by the end of the season to avoid folding, mostly owing to debts left over from over-spending during the 1970s; and Camberwell, more than $100,000 in debt and unable to pay its players, established the "Save the Cobras" campaign to re-establish community support and remain afloat.
In the televised match-of-the-round on 7 July, Brunswick-Broadmeadows fell just short of overcoming a 70-point three-quarter time deficit against Preston. Preston 18.13 (121) led Brunswick-Broadmeadows 7.9 (51) at three-quarter time, but Brunswick-Broadmeadows kicked first eleven goals of the final quarter, including six goals in eight minutes, to draw within three points of Preston; Preston's Adrian Marcon kicked a goal in the 27th minute to steady the game for Preston; Preston 19.15 (129) d. Brunswick-Broadmeadows 18.12 (120).
For the first time, the Melbourne City Council gave its approval for the Association to stage the grand final at Princes Park. The Association had tried to move the grand final to Princes Park from as early as 1979, but had always previously faced opposition to Sunday football from the council.

See also
 List of VFA/VFL Premiers
 Australian Rules Football
 Victorian Football League

References

Victorian Football League seasons
VFL